The Manitoba Curling Tour (MCT) Championships is an annual bonspiel on the men's and women's World Curling Tour. It has been part of the WCT since 2013.

The "furthest advancing eligible team" earns a berth to the provincial championships (the Viterra Championship for men and the Manitoba Scotties Tournament of Hearts for women). This has been the case since 2002-03.

Qualification for events on the Manitoba Curling Tour requires an affiliation fee which is paid into the purse of the MCT Championships. The event has been held since the 1991-92 season for men and the 1996-97 season for women.

Past men's champions (since 2008)

Past women's champions (since 2011)

References

World Curling Tour events
Women's World Curling Tour events
Curling in Manitoba